Carrabelle–Thompson Airport  is a public use airport located three nautical miles (6 km) west of the central business district of Carrabelle, a city in Franklin County, Florida, United States. It is owned by the Carrabelle Port and Airport Authority.

History
During World War II, the facility was built in 1943 by the United States Army Air Forces as a Third Air Force auxiliary landing field known as Carrabelle Flight Strip.  During the war, it served as an auxiliary airfield, controlled by Dale Mabry Army Airfield near Tallahassee.  No permanent units were assigned to the airfield.

Turned over to civil use after the war, it is now a public airport providing general aviation service.

Facilities and aircraft 
Carrabelle–Thompson Airport covers an area of 202 acres (82 ha) at an elevation of 20 feet (6 m) above mean sea level. It has one runway designated 5/23 with an asphalt surface measuring 4,000 by 75 feet (1,219 x 23 m). For the 12-month period ending August 28, 2009, the airport had 524 aircraft operations, an average of 43 per month: 95% general aviation and 5% military.

See also

 Florida World War II Army Airfields

References

 Shaw, Frederick J. (2004), Locating Air Force Base Sites History's Legacy, Air Force History and Museums Program, United States Air Force, Washington DC, 2004.

External links
 Aerial image as of January 1999 from USGS The National Map

1943 establishments in Florida
Airports in Florida
Transportation buildings and structures in Franklin County, Florida
Airports established in 1943
Airfields of the United States Army Air Forces in Florida
Flight Strips of the United States Army Air Forces